Edward Anthony may refer to:

Edward Anthony (photographer) (1819–1888), American photographer and one of the founders of E. & H. T. Anthony & Company
 Edward Anthony (writer) (1895–1971) American writer and journalist

See also
 Eddie Anthony (1890–1934), jazz musician